Albert Stegemann (born 9 March 1976) is a German farmer and politician. Born in Nordhorn, Lower Saxony, he represents the CDU. Albert Stegemann has served as a member of the Bundestag from the state of Lower Saxony since 2013.

Life 
He became member of the bundestag after the 2013 German federal election. He is a member of the Committee for Food and Agriculture.

References

External links 

  
 Bundestag biography 

1976 births
Living people
Members of the Bundestag for Lower Saxony
Members of the Bundestag 2021–2025
Members of the Bundestag 2017–2021
Members of the Bundestag 2013–2017
Members of the Bundestag for the Christian Democratic Union of Germany
German farmers